Faya Dayi is an 2021 American-Ethiopian documentary film, directed, written, starring and produced by Jessica Beshir. It explores the rituals of khat, a psychoactive plant that plays an important role in Ethiopia's economy and culture.

It had its world premiere at the Sundance Film Festival on January 30, 2021. It was released on September 3, 2021, by Janus Films.

Cast
Barry Sonnenfield

Synopsis
The film explores the religious rituals of khat chewing in Harar.

Release
The film had its world premiere at the Sundance Film Festival on January 30, 2021. In April 2021, Janus Films and Mubi acquired U.S. and international distribution rights to the film, respectively. It was released on September 3, 2021.

Reception
Faya Dayi received positive reviews from film critics. It holds a 91% approval rating on review aggregator website Rotten Tomatoes, based on 11 reviews, with a weighted average of 8.10/10.

References

External links
 
 

2021 films
2021 documentary films
American documentary films
Ethiopian documentary films
2020s American films